300 Lésions is a 2004 album recorded by French pop-rock act Kyo. It was released on December 28, 2004, and achieved huge success in France, Belgium (Wallonia) and Switzerland, where it was respectively #1, #1 and #2. This album, entirely composed by the band, is its third album overall and remains to date its second most successful one. It provided two singles : "Contact" (#8 in France, #11 in Belgium, #37 in Switzerland) and "Sarah" (#33 in France, #31 in Belgium, #65 in Switzerland).The single "Contact" is featured on the videogame FIFA 06.

The lyrics, mainly written by Benoît Poher, are more gloomy than on band's previous albums (e.g. "Ce soir" ou "L'Enfer"), with much of the music stripping back the pop elements and leaning more into the band's alternative rock influences, which would later be further expanded on in Poher and Florian's project Empyr. Florian Dubos performs three songs : "Révolution", "Je te rêve encore" and "L'Assaut des regards".

Track listing

Source : Allmusic.

Personnel 

 Benoît Poher – vocals
 Florian Dubos – guitar, backing vocals
 Nicolas Chassagne – guitar
 Fabien Dubos – drums

Releases

Certifications and sales

Charts

References

2004 albums
Kyo (band) albums